John Will may refer to:

 John Will (fighter) (born 1957), martial artist from Australia
 John George Will (1892–1917),  Scottish rugby union player and Royal Flying Corps officer
 John Shiress Will (1840–1910), British legal writer and politician
 John M. Will (1899–1981), American naval officer